Croydon Youth Theatre Organisation, often referred to simply as CYTO, is a professionally  led youth theatre group based at the Shoestring Theatre in South Norwood, Croydon in South London, England.

CYTO was founded in 1965, following a visit by Marjorie Taylor, a Youth Service officer for Croydon Council, to the Youth Theatre at Southbourne in Dorset. Having gained the approval of her bosses at the council, Taylor approached a local amateur dramatics group, the Croydon Histrionic Society, a leading member of which, R Willis Hole, chaired a working party to set the project up. The organisation was launched in the Croydon Advertiser of 10 September 1965, with opening night on 21 September.

CYTO began in Council premises in Winterbourne Road, Thornton Heath, with sister projects in Coulsdon and Upper Norwood. Productions of all three were directed by Carol King and presented at Croydon College. CYTO was consolidated at Winterbourne Road in 1973, moving to Sydenham Road then to Boston Road, where the 'Shoestring Theatre' was born. In 1984, with the help of Councillor Keith Wells and then-director, Harry MacDonald, CYTO moved to its current base, at that time alongside the South Norwood Adult Education Centre in Oakley Road. The former school gym provided an ideal space for a small studio theatre with 78 seats and two former science classrooms became a space for rehearsals, workshops, socials, meetings (The Green Room) and a dance studio (in 2000) Theatre Workshop Coulsdon carried on the work in the south of the Borough. (In 2015 Oasis Academy Ryelands replaced CALAT.)
In 2005, CYTO celebrated its 40th birthday with a production of Ruby, a specially written play by Richard Vincent, himself a former director of CYTO with his wife, Kathryn.

In 2008 CYTO commissioned the show Shank from Richard Vincent.  CYTO took Shank to the annual Big Youth Theatre Festival and performed it at Tate Britain on 27 September 2008. In 2009, CYTO succeeded in attracting funding to perform Shank at various schools and colleges around Croydon and the surrounding area. The production was, finally, invited to the National Youth Theatre Festival in Fife, Scotland in July 2010.

When, in 2011, the council's 'restructuring' of its services threatened the future of the organization -  removing the staff and the budgets to support visiting directors and professional dancers, actors, musicians, designers etc., – expressions of support, and money, were received from hundreds of wellwishers – former and current members, parents and carers who valued what CYTO offered to their young people.

CYTO performed its last production under the direction of Viv Berry and choreographer Delores Kumah in July 2011, with 5 performances of the Madness musical, Our House.

From the departure of Viv Berry in July 2011, CYTO was without an Artistic Director for a number of years following those major changes in the council's youth service. That was until January 2022, when Andrew McPherson was appointed in the role. CYTO has been managed by a group of volunteers with the occasional luxury of some part-time administrative and fundraising support.  CYTO continues to provide sessions on acting, technical production and direction for young people aged 6–19. The Shoestring Theatre has a theatre space with seating for 76, a dance studio and rehearsal space.

CYTO has been the springboard for stars such as Russell Floyd, who starred in EastEnders and The Bill, Paul Bazely (Pirates of the Caribbean, Benidorm and many radio plays), Craig Stevenson, who has enjoyed a 30-year career as a professional actor, appearing in Robin Hood, Prince of Thieves and Highlander, because of the training and inspiration he received at CYTO,  Clare Holman, familiar to Inspector Morse and Lewis'' fans. Former members include Clive Wood, Paul Bigley, Moria Brooker (As Time Goes By) Jo Castleton (currently starring in War Horse), Jo Howarth she  has   worked  with Royal Shakespeare Company and many productions worldwide Terry Ashe who appeared in many productions Uk and worldwide.

In 2014, Richard Vincent returned to write and direct an adaptation of Cinderella entitled 'Sparkling Ashes', and in December of last year a performance to celebrate CYTO's 50th saw Vincent and Viv Berry make a return. The performance again was written by Richard and co directed by Berry. This was Viv's last appearance since 2011. This performance attracted the likes of TV presenter Matthew Wright and actor Paul Bazely who attended as members of the organisation, to watch and support the show. Matthew spoke highly of the youth theatre on the night of the celebrations and the following morning on his own show.

In subsequent years CYTO has continued to create productions with a variety of directors. Now with Artistic Director, Andrew McPherson, in place they are producing 'Superglue' by Tim Crouch as part of the National Theatre Connections Festival, which will tour to Southwark Playhouse in April 2022. Plans for the future will see young people of Croydon and surrounding areas produce innovative new writing and devised plays for the community. 
 
A spokesman said: “CYTO has seen a multitude of young talent pour through its doors and has had a lasting impact on thousands of people creating everything from stuntmen to actors, careers in stage management to singers in Singapore.”

External links
BBC h2g2 entry on CYTO
cyto.org.uk
Theatre Workshop Coulsdon

Media and communications in the London Borough of Croydon
Theatre companies in London
Youth organisations based in the United Kingdom
Culture in the London Borough of Croydon
Youth theatre companies
Charities based in London